Ren Ruiping (born February 1, 1976, in Shandong) is a Chinese female triple jumper. Ren set three world junior records in triple jump, and is a former Asian record holder with 14.66 metres. The record now belongs to Olga Rypakova of Kazakhstan with 15.25 metres.

Achievements

Personal bests
Long jump - 6.51 m (1996)
Triple jump - 14.66 m (1997)

References

External links

1976 births
Living people
Athletes (track and field) at the 1998 Asian Games
Athletes (track and field) at the 1996 Summer Olympics
Athletes (track and field) at the 2000 Summer Olympics
Chinese female triple jumpers
Olympic athletes of China
Athletes from Shandong
Asian Games medalists in athletics (track and field)
Asian Games gold medalists for China
Medalists at the 1998 Asian Games